Prachinburi is a town (thesaban mueang) in central Thailand, capital of Prachinburi Province. It covers the entire tambon Na Mueang of the Mueang Prachinburi District (city district). As of 2000, the population of the town was 25,157.

Geography

Climate
Prachinburi has a tropical savanna climate (Köppen climate classification Aw). Winters are dry and very warm. The monsoon season runs from late April through October, with heavy rain and somewhat cooler temperatures during the day, although nights remain warm.

Transportation
The main road through Prachinburi is Route 319. While Route 319 does not lead directly to other major centers, along with Route 33 it leads to Nakhon Nayok, and along with Routes 314 and 304 it leads to Bangkok.

Prachinburi is a station on the State Railway of Thailand's Eastern Line,  from Bangkok.

Hospital
Chaophraya Abhaibhubejhr Hospital is a Thai traditional medicine center. It was built in 1909 for King Rama V on his next royal visit to Prachinburi, but the king never again visited. The building was named after the man who funded the construction, Chao Phraya Abhaibhubejhr, the governor of Prachinburi at the time. In 1994, Thailand's government renovated the Chao Phraya Abhaibhubejhr Building as a Thai traditional medical hub and museum. Chao Phraya Abhaibhubejhr Hospital is known for herbal products, traditional Thai medicine, and Thai massage. The brand of herbal medicines, cosmetics, toiletries, and elixirs is "Abhaibhubejhr".

References

External links

Populated places in Prachinburi province